The Carolinian forest refers to a life zone in eastern North America characterized primarily by the predominance of deciduous (broad-leaf) forest.  The term "Carolinian", which is most commonly used in Canada, refers to the deciduous forests which span across much of the eastern United States from the Carolinas northward into southern Ontario, Canada. These deciduous forests in the United States and southern Ontario share many similar characteristics and species hence their association. Today the term is often used to refer to the Canadian portion (northern limit) of the deciduous forest region while the portion in the United States is often referred to as the "Eastern deciduous forest".

Location and extent
The Carolinian zone spans across much of the eastern United States, with extensive coverage in the Virginias, Kentucky, Tennessee, Maryland, Delaware, Pennsylvania, parts of southern New York state, Connecticut, and Rhode Island, eastern Ohio, and small parts of southern Michigan, Indiana, and western Ohio. It extends up into Southern Ontario, Canada which is located in the fertile ecozone of the Mixedwood Plains and includes ecodistricts 7E-1 to 7E-6. 

Trees found here include various species of ash, birch, chestnut, hickory, oak, and walnut; tallest of all is the tulip tree. Fruit trees native to this zone include the pawpaw. Animal life includes raccoons, possums, squirrels (including the relatively rare southern flying squirrel), nuthatches, and chickadees.

Carolinian Canada 
The Carolinian forest in Canada is located at the southern tip of Ontario between Lake Erie, Lake Huron and Lake Ontario. The region contains an extremely high biodiversity of species, over 500 of which are considered rare.

Climate 
The reason for the high biodiversity in this region is its unique climate; the Carolinian forest of Ontario has the warmest average annual temperatures, the longest frost-free seasons, and the mildest winters of any region in Ontario. This distinctive climate is largely due to the nearby Great Lakes which moderate the temperature of the surrounding land.

Status 
The high fertility of the land has seen the region become highly developed and populated, with agricultural, industrial, commercial and urban areas. Today, the Carolinian Zone contains major cities and is home to one quarter of Canada's population despite being 0.25% of the total land area. The deforestation of the region for this development has led to significant habitat loss and fragmentation, leaving the remaining portions of land scattered and disconnected, with some areas still threatened by human development. In total, it is estimated that forest cover has been reduced from 80% to 11.3% while wetlands reduced from 28.3% to 5.1%. In addition to habitat loss and fragmentation, the native Carolinian species are also being threatened by invasive species such as garlic mustard and buckthorn, and overgrazing by White-tailed deer. A list of invasive species in the Carolinian zone can be found here. These factors have contributed to the Carolinian zone becoming the most threatened region in Ontario, with over 125 species of plants and animals listed as either vulnerable, threatened or endangered by the federal or provincial governments. This is over one-third of all vulnerable, threatened or endangered species in Canada. A full list of these species can be found here.

Conservation efforts 
Some parts of the remaining natural area in the Carolinian zone are protected in an effort to conserve the region and its unique, diverse biota. For example, today there are many protected areas including Point Pelee National Park, 21 provincial parks, and many conservation areas. Some of the best preserved areas of Canada's Carolinian forest are located in Windsor's Ojibway Prairie Complex and Rondeau Provincial Park near Morpeth, Ontario; another is the Niagara Glen Nature Reserve near Niagara Falls, Ontario. There are also organizations like the Carolinian Canada Coalition who aim to restore the region as much as possible. Carolinian forests are complex ecosystems that cannot be replicated in gardens or other small areas.  The only way to preserve this unique habitat is continue to keep larger areas of land protected from development and agriculture.

Other conservation efforts have included the reduction of the white-tailed deer population from their peak density of 55 deer km−2 to 7 deer km−2, between the years of 1996-2009. However, studies have found that while this helps reduce further forest damage, continued decline in the forest canopy can still occur, indicating the recovery from overgrazing by herbivores on the forest canopy is a long process without immediate results. Maintaining a lower density of white-tailed deer, while increasing the seed sources of native trees and protecting tree saplings in herbivore exclosures are all suggested ways of helping the Carolinian forest recover or at least conserve what is remaining.

Examples of species
Fauna:

White-tailed deer
American black bear
Virginia opossum
American badger
Gray fox
Bobcat
Southern flying squirrel
Wild turkey
Ruffed grouse
Hooded warbler
Prothonotary warbler
Canada Warbler
Carolina wren
Yellow-breasted chat
Northern cardinal
Red bellied woodpecker
Red-tailed hawk
Barn owl
Eastern box turtle
Spotted turtle
Eastern hognose snake
Eastern spiny softshell turtle
Pantherophis gloydi
Red salamander
Karner blue butterfly

Flora:

 Eastern prickly pear cactus
Tulip tree
Sassafras
Miami mist
Kentucky Coffee Tree
Flowering Dogwood
Black Walnut
American Chestnut
Sycamore
Red Mulberry
Black Gum
Red Maple
Eastern White Pine
Eastern Hemlock

Rivers and creeks
Ausable River
Catfish Creek
Credit River
Kettle Creek
Grand River
Rouge River
Sydenham River
Thames River
Twenty Mile Creek
Welland River
Nith River

Other

 Rouge Park
 Barker's Bush
Point Pelee National Park

See also
Temperate broadleaf and mixed forests
Southern Great Lakes forests

References

External links
Carolinian Canada

Temperate broadleaf and mixed forests in the United States
Ecoregions of the United States
Ecoregions of Canada
Forests of Ontario
Forests of the United States
 
Flora of the Eastern United States
 
Temperate broadleaf and mixed forests in Canada